Vision Airways Corporation was an airline based in Timmins, Ontario, Canada.
On 25 November 1994 its operating licenses were suspended.

Code data
IATA Code: V6
ICAO Code: VSN
Callsign: VISION

See also 
 List of defunct airlines of Canada

External links
Canadian Transportation Agency

Defunct airlines of Canada
Airlines disestablished in 1994